Events from the year 1110 in Ireland.

Incumbents
High King of Ireland: Domnall Ua Lochlainn

Events
In the time leading up to the Norman invasion of Ireland, the Normans, were invited guests of Irish royalty.

Births

Deaths

References